Green Hydrogen Catapult is a advocacy group focused on green hydrogen. Launched in 2020 by the United Nations, and supported by RMI, it agitates to bring the cost of green hydrogen (hydrogen produced using renewable power) below US$2 per kilogram (equivalent to $50 per megawatt hour) by 2026.

Although similar in objectives, the Green Hydrogen Catapult is unrelated to the Catapult centres of the United Kingdom.

Members

Founding members
ACWA Power
CWP Renewables
Envision Energy (not listed on GHC's members page as at Jan 2022)
Iberdrola
Ørsted
Snam
Yara International

Subsequent members
Fortescue Future Industries
Mærsk Mc-Kinney Møller Center for Zero Carbon Shipping
H2 Green Steel

References

2020 establishments
Advocacy groups